Marco Caldore (born 28 February 1994) is an Italian professional footballer who plays as a centre back for  club Juve Stabia.

Career
Born in Naples, Caldore started his career in Genoa youth sector. He made his senior debut with Lega Pro Seconda Divisione clubs Aversa and Sorrento.

In July 2014, he signed with Serie C club Gubbio. Caldore made his Serie C debut on 30 August against L'Aquila.

On 1 February 2021, he moved to Serie C club Juve Stabia.

References

External links
 
 

1994 births
Living people
Footballers from Naples
Italian footballers
Association football central defenders
Serie C players
Lega Pro Seconda Divisione players
Serie D players
Genoa C.F.C. players
S.F. Aversa Normanna players
A.S.D. Sorrento players
A.S. Gubbio 1910 players
Paganese Calcio 1926 players
A.S.D. Sangiovannese 1927 players
S.S. Racing Club Roma players
Casertana F.C. players
Taranto F.C. 1927 players
S.S. Juve Stabia players